Midsummer is a celebration of the season of summer usually held at a date around the summer solstice. It has pagan pre-Christian roots in Europe.

The undivided Christian Church designated June 24 as the feast day of the early Christian martyr St John the Baptist, and the observance of St John's Day begins the evening before, known as Saint John's Eve. These are commemorated by many Christian denominations, such as the Roman Catholic Church, Lutheran Churches, and Anglican Communion, as well as by freemasonry. In Sweden, the Midsummer is such an important festivity that there have been proposals to make the Midsummer's Eve the National Day of Sweden, instead of June 6. In Finland, Estonia, Latvia and Lithuania, Midsummer's festival is a public holiday. In Denmark and Norway, it may also be referred to as St. Hans Day.

History

Saint John's Day, the feast day of Saint John the Baptist, was established by the undivided Christian Church in the 4th century AD, in honour of the birth of the Saint John the Baptist, which the Gospel of Luke records as being six months before Jesus. As the Western Christian Churches mark the birth of Jesus on December 25, Christmas, the Feast of Saint John (Saint John's Day) was established at midsummer, exactly six months before the former feast.

Within Christian theology, this carries significance as John the Baptist "was understood to be preparing the way for Jesus", with  stating "He must increase, but I must decrease"; this is symbolized in the fact that the "sun begins to diminish at the summer solstice and eventually increases at the winter solstice." By the 6th century AD, several churches were dedicated in the honour of Saint John the Baptist and a vigil, Saint John's Eve, was added to the feast day of Saint John the Baptist and Christian priests held three Masses in churches for the celebration.

In Florence, medieval midsummer celebrations were "an occasion for dramatic representations of the Baptist's life and death" and "the feast day was marked by processions, banquets, and plays, culminating in a fireworks show that the entire city attended." The historian Ronald Hutton states that the "lighting of festive fires upon Saint John's Eve is first recorded as a popular custom by Jean Belethus, a theologian at the University of Paris, in the early twelfth century".   In England, the earliest reference to this custom occurs in the 13th century AD, in the Liber Memorandum of the parish church at Barnwell in the Nene Valley, which stated that parish youth would gather on the day to sing songs and play games. A Christian monk of Lilleshall Abbey, in the same century, wrote:

The 13th-century monk of Winchcomb, Gloucestershire, who compiled a book of sermons for Christian feast days, recorded how St. John's Eve was celebrated in his time:

Let us speak of the revels which are accustomed to be made on St. John's Eve, of which there are three kinds. On St. John's Eve in certain regions the boys collect bones and certain other rubbish, and burn them, and therefrom a smoke is produced on the air. They also make brands and go about the fields with the brands. Thirdly, the wheel which they roll.

Saint John's Fires, explained the monk of Winchcombe, were to drive away dragons, which were abroad on St. John's Eve, poisoning springs and wells. The wheel that was rolled downhill he gave its explanation: "The wheel is rolled to signify that the sun then rises to the highest point of its circle and at once turns back; thence it comes that the wheel is rolled."

On St John's Day 1333 Petrarch watched women at Cologne rinsing their hands and arms in the Rhine "so that the threatening calamities of the coming year might be washed away by bathing in the river." 15th-century diarist Goro Dati, described the celebration of Saint John's Day at Midsummer in Italy as being one in which guilds prepared their workshops with fine displays, and one in which solemn church processions took place, with men dressed in the costumes of Christian saints and angels.

In the 16th century AD, the historian John Stow, described the celebration of Midsummer:

These fires are commonly called Saint John's Fires in various languages. Historian Ronald Hutton states that the "lighting of festive fires upon St. John's Eve is first recorded as a popular custom by Jean Belethus, a theologian at the University of Paris, in the early twelfth century". In England, the earliest reference to this custom occurs on in the 13th century A.D., in the Liber Memorandum of the parish church at Barnwell in the Nene Valley, which stated that parish youth would gather on the day to sing songs and play games. and served to repel witches and evil spirits. Saint John's Day is also a popular day for infant baptisms and in the 19th century, "baptisms of children who had died 'pagans' were acted out". In Sweden, young people visited holy springs as "a reminder of how John the Baptist baptised Christ in the River Jordan." In addition, historically, "it was a custom to carry lighted torches on Midsummer-eve, as an emblem of St. John the Baptist, who was 'a burning and shining light,' and the preparer of the way of Christ."

Midsummer/Saint John's Day–related traditions, church services, and celebrations are particularly important in northern Europe – Sweden, Denmark, Norway, Finland, Estonia, Latvia and Lithuania – but is also very strongly observed in Poland, Russia, Belarus, Germany, Flanders, Ireland, parts of the United Kingdom (Cornwall especially), France, Italy, Malta, Portugal, Spain, Ukraine, other parts of Europe, and elsewhere – such as Canada, the United States, Puerto Rico, and also in the Southern Hemisphere (mostly in Brazil, Argentina and Australia). In Estonia, Latvia, Lithuania and Quebec (Canada), the traditional Midsummer day, June 24, is a public holiday. So it was formerly also in Sweden and Finland, but in these countries it was, in the 1950s, moved to the Friday and Saturday between June 19 and June 26, respectively.

It is possible that the Christian Church may have adapted a pre-Christian festival celebrating the solstice into a Christian holiday.

Contemporary national traditions

Austria
In Austria, the Midsummer solstice is celebrated each year with a procession of ships down the Danube River as it flows through the wine-growing Wachau Valley north of Vienna. Up to 30 ships sail down the river in line as fireworks erupt from the banks and hill tops while bonfires blaze and the vineyards are lit up. Lighted castle ruins also erupt with fireworks during the 90-minute cruise downstream.

Brazil

Portuguese St. John's Day, brought to Brazil during colonial times, has become a popular event that is celebrated during a period that starts one week before St. Anthony's Day (June 13) and ends after St. Peter's Day (June 29). Despite the Portuguese origin of this festival as a midsummer festival (due to the fact of Portugal being a nation located in the Northern hemisphere), this nationwide festival, called "Festa Junina" (June Festival), or São João (Saint John), takes place during midwinter in most of the country (due to the fact of great part of Brazil is located in the Southern hemisphere).

Rural life is celebrated through typical clothing, food, and dance (particularly square dancing, or quadrilha). The quadrilha features couple formations around a mock wedding whose bride and groom are the central attraction of the dancing. A kind of maypole (called "pau-de-sebo") is also raised and used in some festivities. A typical hot drink is prepared called "quentão" (very hot) that consists in a mix of fruits and spices laced with cachaça. On St. John's Day eve celebration, sometimes a ritual takes place of walking barefoot at midnight on live-coal made of the remnants of the main bonfire, which is a traditional part of the party. It's believed that if the one who walks is strong in faith, he shall not be hurt.

Two northeastern towns in particular have competed with each other for the title of "Biggest Saint John Festival in the World", namely Caruaru (in the state of Pernambuco), and Campina Grande, in Paraíba. The festivities also coincide with the corn harvest, dishes served during this period are commonly made with corn, such as canjica and pamonha; dishes also include boiled or baked vegetable corn (often buttered), sausages, sweet potatoes, peanuts, and numerous sweet dishes such as rice pudding. The celebrations are very colorful and festive and include the use of fireworks and bonfires.

Bulgaria

On Midsummer day, Bulgarians celebrate Enyovden. On the same day, the Eastern Orthodox church celebrates the day of John the Baptist and the rites and traditions of both holidays are often mixed. A fire-related ritual may also be performed in Bulgaria on that day; it involves barefoot dance on smoldering embers and is called Nestinarstvo. Bulgarian folklore states the beginning of summer starts on Enyovden. It is thought that in the morning of Enyovden, when the sun rises, it "winks’ and "plays". Anyone seeing the sunrise will be healthy throughout the year. It is believed that on Enyovden a variety of herbs have the greatest healing power, and that this is especially true at sunrise. Therefore, they have to be picked early in the morning before dawn. Women – sorceresses and enchantresses – go to gather herbs by themselves to cure and make charms. The herbs gathered for the winter must be 77 and a half – for all diseases and for the nameless disease.

Canada

In Newfoundland and Labrador, St. John's Day is observed on the Monday nearest June 24 and commemorates John Cabot's discovery of Newfoundland in 1497. In Quebec, the celebration of June 24 was brought to New France by the first French colonists. Great fires were lit at night. According to the Jesuit Relations, the first celebrations of St John's Day in New France took place around 1638. In 1834, Ludger Duvernay, printer and editor of La Minerve took the leadership of an effort to make June 24 the national holiday of the Canadiens (French Canadians). In 1908, Pope Pius X designated John the Baptist as the patron saint of the French-Canadians. In 1925, June 24 became a legal holiday in Quebec and in 1977, it became the secular National Holiday of Quebec. It still is the tradition to light great fires on the night of the 24th of June.

Croatia
The tradition of Sveti Ivan Krstitelj (St. John Baptist), also called Ivanjdan or Svitnjak in Western Herzegovina and coastal Croatia, is celebrated on June 23 in Croatia. The people light large bonfires in the name of Saint John Baptist, and the celebration can also be connected to the old Slavic traditions for Kresnik (South Slavic version of Perun) the god of Sun. The locals bring firewood to a designated place and light a bonfire at sunset; with children attempt to jump over as it as it burns. Rivalries between villages on who makes the bigger bonfire is common, leading to competitions between village folk.

Denmark

In Denmark, the solstitial celebration is called sankthans or sankthansaften ("St. John's Eve"). It was an official holiday until 1770, and in accordance with the Danish tradition of celebrating a holiday on the evening before the actual day, it takes place on the evening of 23 June. It is the day where the medieval wise men and women (the doctors of that time) would gather special herbs that they needed for the rest of the year to cure people.

Bonfires on the beach, speeches, picnics and songs are traditional, although they are built in many other places where beaches may not be close by (i.e. on the shores of lakes and other waterways, parks, etc.)  Bonfires are lit in order to repel witches and other evil spirits, with the burnings sending the "witch" away to Bloksbjerg, the Brocken mountain in the Harz region of Germany where the great witch gathering was thought to be held on this day. Some Danes regard this tradition of burning witches as inappropriate.

In Scandinavia, young people visited holy springs as "a reminder of how John the Baptist baptised Christ in the River Jordan."

On Saint John's Eve and Saint John's Day, churches arrange Saint John's worship services and family reunions also occur, which are an occasion for drinking and eating.

In 1885, Holger Drachmann wrote a midsommervise (Midsummer hymn) called "Vi elsker vort land..." ("We Love Our Country") with a melody composed by P.E. Lange-Müller that is sung at most bonfires on this evening.

Estonia

Jaanipäev ("Jaan's Day" or "Midsummer Day" in English or "St. John's Day" for Christians) was celebrated long before the arrival of Christianity in Estonia, although the day was given its modern name by Christians. The day is still known by its many names as: leedopäev, suvine pööripäiv, suvepööripäev, püäripääv, päevakäänak, päiväkäänäk, päiväkäändjäne, päevapesa, pesapäev and suured päevad. The arrival of Christianity, however, did not end pagan beliefs and fertility rituals surrounding this holiday. In 1578, Balthasar Russow wrote in his Livonian Chronicle about Estonians who placed more importance on the festival than going to church. He complained about those who went to church, but did not enter, and instead spent their time lighting bonfires, drinking, dancing, singing and following pagan rituals. Midsummer marks a change in the farming year, specifically the break between the completion of spring sowing and the hard work of summer hay-making.

Understandably, some of the rituals of Jaanipäev have very strong folkloric roots. One of the best-known Jaanik or midsummer ritual is the lighting of the bonfire and jumping over it. This is seen as a way of guaranteeing prosperity and avoiding bad luck. Likewise, to not light the fire is to invite the destruction of your house by fire. The fire also frightened away mischievous spirits who avoided it at all costs, thus ensuring a good harvest. So, the bigger the fire, the further the mischievous spirits stayed away. Estonian midsummer traditions are most similar to Finnish midsummer traditions but also have some similarities with Latvian, Lithuanian and Scandinavian traditions.

Estonians celebrate Jaaniõhtu on the eve of the Summer Solstice (June 23) with bonfires. On the islands of Saaremaa and Hiiumaa, old fishing boats may be burned in the large pyres set ablaze. On Jaaniõhtu, Estonians all around the country will gather with their families, or at larger events to celebrate this important day with singing and dancing, as Estonians have done for centuries. The celebrations that accompany Jaaniõhtu carry on usually through the night, they are the largest and most important of the year, and the traditions are almost identical to Finland (read under Finland) and similar to neighbors Latvia, Lithuania and Sweden (read under Sweden).

Jaanipäev is usually spent in a summer cottage, where people light bonfires, or at a festival, such as Pühajärve Jaanituli in Otepää.

Since 1934,  June 23 is also national Victory Day of Estonia and both 23rd and 24th are holidays and flag flying days. The Estonian flag is not lowered in the night between these two days.

Faroe Islands
On the Faroe Islands, St. John's Eve (jóansøka) is generally not celebrated. However, on the southernmost island of Suðuroy it is observed by lighting a bonfire. Only one bonfire is lit on the island as one of the two biggest towns hosts the celebration alternately every other year.

Finland

The summer solstice was called Ukon juhla ("Ukko's celebration") after the Finnish god Ukko. After the celebrations were Christianized, the holiday became known as juhannus after John the Baptist (Finnish: Johannes Kastaja).

Since 1955, the holiday has always been on a Saturday (between June 20 and June 26). Earlier it was always on June 24. Many of the celebrations of midsummer take place on Friday, midsummer eve, when many workplaces are closed and shops may close their doors at noon.

In the Finnish midsummer celebration, bonfires (Finnish kokko) are very common and are burned at lakesides and by the sea. Often branches from birch trees (koivu) are placed on both side of the front door to welcome visitors. Swedish-speaking Finns often celebrate by erecting a midsummer or maypole (Swedish midsommarstång, majstång). Some Swedish-speaking Finns call the holiday Johannes or Johanni after the Finnish term juhannus – or more accurately after the Biblical John the Baptist  (="Johannes Döparen" in Swedish).

In folk magic, midsummer was a very potent night and the time for many small rituals, mostly for young maidens seeking suitors and fertility. Will-o'-the-wisps were believed to appear at midsummer night, particularly to finders of the mythical "fern in bloom" and possessors of the "fern seed", marking a treasure. In the old days, maidens would use special charms and bend over a well, naked, in order to see their future husband's reflection. In another tradition that continues still today, an unmarried woman collects seven different flowers and places them under her pillow to dream of her future husband.

An important feature of the midsummer in Finland is the white night and the midnight sun. Because of Finland's location around the Arctic Circle the nights near the midsummer day are short (with twilight even at midnight) or non-existent. This gives a great contrast to the darkness of the winter time. The temperature can vary between 0 °C and +30 °C, with an average of about 20 °C in the South.

Many Finns leave the cities for Midsummer and spend time in the countryside. Nowadays many spend at least a few days there, and some Finns take their whole vacation at a summer cottage. Traditions include bonfires, cookouts, sauna and spending time together with friends or family. Heavy drinking is also associated with the Finnish midsummer.

Many music festivals of all sizes are organized on the Midsummer weekend. It is also common to start summer vacation on Midsummer day. For many families Midsummer is the time when they move to the countryside to their summer cottage by the sea or lake. Midsummer is also a Finnish Flag Day: the national flag is hoisted at 6 pm on Midsummer's Eve and flown throughout the night until 9 pm the next evening. This is an exception to the normal rule of flying the flag from 8 am to sunset. Finnish Canadians in the New Finland district, Saskatchewan, Canada celebrate Juhannus.

France
It takes place on June 24, on Midsummer day (St John's Day). In certain French towns, a tall bonfire is built by the inhabitants in order to be lit on St John's Day.

France also rejoices on June 21 for the Fête de la Musique, which became an international celebration over time.

Germany

The day of sun solstice is called  in German of which a word by word translation is "summer sun turning". On June 20, 1653, the Nuremberg town council issued the following order: "Where experience herefore have shown, that after the old heathen use, on John's day in every year, in the country, as well in towns as villages, money and wood have been gathered by young folk, and there upon the so-called  or zimmet fire kindled, and thereat winebibbing, dancing about the said fire, leaping over the same, with burning of sundry herbs and flowers, and setting of brands from the said fire in the fields, and in many other ways all manner of superstitious work carried on — Therefore the Hon. Council of Nürnberg town neither can nor ought to forbear to do away with all such unbecoming superstition, paganism, and peril of fire on this coming day of St. John."

Bonfires are still a custom in many areas of Germany. People gather to watch the bonfire and celebrate solstice.

The date also marks the end of harvest for spring vegetables such as asparagus ("Spargelsilvester") or for rhubarb.

Greece
According to Eastern Orthodox tradition the eve of the day of the Nativity of John the Baptist is celebrated with festivals in many towns and villages, both in the mainland and in the Greek isles. Traditionally the midsummers celebration is called  meaning sign or oracle, and was considered a time when unmarried girls would discover their potential mates through a ritual. It is also customary to this day to burn the Mayday wreaths that are used to decorate the doors of the houses for the previous two months, in large communal bonfires, accompanied by music, dancing and jumping over the flames. It takes place on May 30 and May 31.

Hungary
On June 21 Hungarians celebrate "Saint Ivan's Night" ( being derived from the Slavic form of Johannes/John, Ivan, which may correspond to Hungarian ,). The whole month of June was once called the Month of St. Ivan until the 19th century. Setting fires is a folklore tradition this night. Girls jumped over it, while boys watched the spectacle.

Most significant among the customs of the summer is lighting the fire of Midsummer Night on the day of St. John (June 24), when the sun follows the highest course, when the nights are the shortest and the days the longest. The practice of venerating Saint John the Baptist developed in the Catholic Church during the 5th century, and at this time they put his name and day on June 24. The summer solstice was celebrated among most peoples, so the Hungarians may have known it even before the Hungarian conquest of the Carpathian Basin. Although the Arab historian Ibn Rusta speaks of the Hungarians' fire worshipping, so far there is no data that could connect it to this day. In the Middle Ages it was primarily an ecclesiastical festivity, but from the 16th century on the sources recall it as a folk custom. The most important episode of the custom is the lighting of the fire.

The custom survived longest and in the most complete form in the northwestern part of the linguistic region, where as late as the 1930s they still lit a Midsummer Night fire. The way of arranging the participants by age and by sex has suggested the possibility that these groups sang by answering each other, but there are hardly any remnants that appear to support this possibility. People jumped over the fire after they lit it. This practice is mentioned as early as the 16th century, although at that time in connection with a wedding; still, it is called "Midsummer Night fire". The purpose of jumping over the fire is partly to purify, partly because they believed that those whose jump was very successful would get married during the following carnival.

India
In India, within the context of Hinduism, the Summer Solstice, or Midsummer's day, takes place on the 21st of June and is known as the Uttarayana. It is a day denoted with celebration, observation, and practice of Yoga.

Iran
Tiregān is one of ancient Iranian festival coinciding with the mid summer festivals, another midsummer festival is Gilaki Bal Nowrooz which is held in the north of Iran.

Bal Nowrooz, meaning ‘the fire of Nowrooz’, is the name of a festival celebrated on the first day of ‘Our Nowrooz’ and this is the first day of Daylaman New Year.

Lighting the fire, thanking God for his blessings and crops, and praying for the peace of the souls of the dead were parts of this ancient Iranian tradition. This ceremony coincides with harvesting in Gilan.

On the first day of ‘Our Nowrooz’, the newly wed couples who have married in the past year, are given white horses to ride up to the foot of the mountain. As the brides and grooms reach the mountain foot, a yellow cow is set free, as a sign of happiness and abundance for the new couples.

Ireland
Many towns and cities have 'Midsummer Carnivals' with fairs, concerts and fireworks either on or on the weekend nearest to Midsummer. In rural spots throughout the west, northwest, southwest and County Cork, bonfires are lit on hilltops on Saint John's Eve. This tradition harks back to pagan times. The Irish Environmental Protection Agency, after much initial upset in the west of Ireland, has an exemption for the burning of fires outdoors during midsummer night.

The Ballagh, a village in County Wexford, where the church is dedicated to St John the Baptist, holds its Patron on the first Sunday in July, this Sunday being the closest to the Old Calendar date for St John's Day.

Italy

San Giovanni's day has been celebrated in Florence since medieval times, and certainly in the Renaissance, with festivals sometimes lasting three days from 21 to 24 June. Such celebrations are held nowadays in Cesena from June 21 to 24, featuring a special street market.
Saint John the Baptist is the patron saint of Genoa, Florence and Turin where fireworks displays take place during the celebration. In Turin Saint John's festival has been practiced since medieval times, with people from the surrounding areas coming to dance around the bonfire in the central square.

Italian neopagans usually celebrate Midsummer with rites, dances and festivals all around the country.

Jersey

In Jersey most of the former midsummer customs are largely ignored nowadays. The custom known as Les cônes d'la Saint Jean was observed as late as the 1970s – horns or conch shells were blown. Ringing the bachîn (a large brass preserving pan) at midsummer to frighten away evil spirits survived as a custom on some farms until the 1940s and has been revived as a folk performance in the 21st century.

Latvia

In Latvia, Midsummer is called Jāņi  (plural of Latvian name Jānis, which is equivalent to John) or Līgo svētki (svētki = festival). It is a national holiday celebrated from the night of June 23 through June 24 on a large scale by almost everyone in Latvia and by people of Latvian origin abroad. Celebrations consist of a lot of traditional and mostly pagan elements – eating, Jāņi cheese, drinking beer, baking pīrāgi, singing Latvian folk songs dedicated to Jāņi, burning bonfires to keep light all through the night and jumping over it, wearing wreaths of flowers (for women) and oak leaves (for men) together with modern commercial products and ideas. There are tens and hundreds of different beliefs and traditions all over Latvia on what should be done on that day for good harvest, for predicting the future, for attracting your future spouse etc. People decorate their houses and lands with birch or sometimes oak branches and flowers as well as leaves, especially fern. In rural areas livestock is also decorated. In modern days small oak branches with leaves are attached to the cars in Latvia during the festivity. Jāņi has been a strong aspect of Latvian culture throughout history, originating in pre-Christian Latvia as an ancient fertility cult.

In the western town of Kuldīga, revellers mark the holiday by running naked through the town at three in the morning. The event has taken place since 2000. Runners are rewarded with beer, and police are on hand in case any "puritans" attempt to interfere with the naked run.

Lithuania

Midsummer is commonly called John's Day (Joninės) in Lithuania, and is also known as Saint Jonas' Festival, Rasos (Dew Holiday), Kupolė, Midsummer Day and St. John's Day. It is celebrated in the night from 23 June to 24 June and on 24 June. The traditions include singing songs and dancing until the sun sets, telling tales, searching to find the magic fern blossom at midnight, jumping over bonfires, greeting the rising midsummer sun and washing the face with a morning dew, young girls float flower wreaths on the water of river or lake. These are customs brought from pagan culture and beliefs. The latter Christian tradition is based on the reverence of Saint John. Lithuanians with the names Jonas, Jonė, Janina receive many greetings from their family, relatives and friends.

Norway

As in Denmark, Sankthansaften is celebrated on June 23 in Norway. The day is also called Jonsok, which means "John's wake", important in Roman Catholic times with pilgrimages to churches and holy springs. For instance, up until 1840, there was a pilgrimage to the Røldal Stave Church in Røldal (southwest Norway) whose crucifix was said to have healing powers. Today, however, Sankthansaften is largely regarded as a secular or even pre-Christian event.

In most places, the main event is the burning of a large bonfire. In Western Norway, a custom of arranging mock weddings, both between adults and between children, is still kept alive. The wedding was meant to symbolize the blossoming of new life. Such weddings are known to have taken place in the 1800s, but the custom is believed to be older.

It is also said that, if a girl puts flowers under her pillow that night, she will dream of her future husband.

Poland
Especially in northern Poland – the Eastern Pomeranian and Kashubian regions – midsummer is celebrated on 21 or 22 June. Girls throw wreaths made of flowers and candles into the Baltic Sea, and into lakes or rivers. The midsummer day celebration starts at about 8:00 p.m. and lasts all night until sunrise. People celebrate this special day every year and call it Noc Świętojańska which means St. John's Night. On that day in big Polish cities (like Warsaw and Kraków) there are many organized events, the most popular event being in Kraków, called the Wianki, which means wreaths. In many parts of Poland the Summer solstice is celebrated as Kupala Night. Also, an important tradition is looking in the forest for the flower of the fern (as fern does not flower, this means something impossible to find without an interference of magic). Jumping above bonfires used to be a widely spread custom too.

Portugal

In Portugal, Midsummer festivities are included in what is known today as Santos Populares (Popular Saints celebrations), celebrating the three main saints of June: St. Anthony (13 June), celebrated in Lisbon, Estarreja, Vila Nova de Famalicão, and Vila Real among others; São João (St. John's Day, 24 June) in Porto, Braga, Figueira da Foz, Vila do Conde, Almada and many others; St. Peter's day (29 June) in Seixal, Sintra, Póvoa de Varzim, Barcelos, and various other locations, mostly associated with fishermen.

In anticipation of Popular Saints, streets are decorated with balloons and arches made out of brightly coloured paper, people dance in the city's squares, and Cascatas (makeshift altars), dedicated to the saints, are put up to show each neighbourhood's devotion and pride. These holidays are days of festivities with good food and refreshments. Typical dishes include Caldo verde (Portuguese cabbage and potato soup), sardinhas assadas na brasa (open grilled sardines), boroa (oven baked bread), funfair food (mostly cotton candy and farturas, a fried batter with sugar and cinnamon) and drink (mostly) red wine and água-pé (grape juice with a small percentage of alcohol).

Around the day of the festivities, there is also group folk dancing, traditional music, including Cantar à desgarrada (musical rhyming duels), and the inescapable firework displays. Until fire regulations brought about by some serious forest fires discouraged them, bonfires and hot air balloons were lit, around which all these events used to happen. Revellers would try to jump over the bonfire, mostly young men trying to show off to the young women, and older men trying to convince themselves that they are still young. Other typical activities include trying to clime a pau-de-sebo (greased pole) to claim a reward (frequently a cod or ham)  and Rusgas which are a mixture of running, singing, dancing and tomfoolery, mostly by youthful groups. Funfair attractions have also become a mainstay of festivities.

In Lisbon, in Avenida da Liberdade, there are the Marchas, a parade of folklore and costumes of the inhabitants from the city's different traditional quarters, with hundreds of singers and dancers and a vast audience applauding their favourite participants. As St. Anthony is the matchmaker saint, it is still the tradition in Lisbon to celebrate multiple marriages (200 to 300) and according to tradition, one can declare oneself to someone one fancies in the heat of the festivities by offering the loved one a manjerico (a flower-pot with a sweet basil plant) and a love poem.

In Porto and Braga St. John's is celebrated in the streets, where many normally frowned-upon things are permitted. People carry a plant of flowering leek (alho-porro, which has a pungent smell) with them, and run it over the face of other people. Starting in 1963, people have also carried a small plastic hammer which they use to bang their neighbors over the head. The tradition is that St. John was a scalliwag in his youth and the people hit him on the head with the garlic saying "return to the right path".

In traditional fisher towns, festivities take place on Saint Peter's Day, Póvoa do Varzim, which became a municipal holiday in the 1960s. Póvoa de Varzim's Saint Peter Festival keeps traditional "Santos Populares" elements, such as the bonfire, street celebrations, and include the rusgas, in which inhabitants of one quarter (bairro) parade to other neighbourhoods in the evening of June 28. Women are dressed as tricana (women dressed in a traditional costume with a sensual walking style). Each neighbourhood has its own festival and colors for identification.

Romania

In Romania, the Midsummer celebrations are named Drăgaica or Sânziene. Drăgaica is celebrated by a dance performed by a group of 5–7 young girls of which one is chosen as the Drăgaica. She is dressed as a bride, with wheat wreath, while the other girls, dressed in white wear a veil with bedstraw flowers. Midsummer fairs are held in many Romanian villages and cities. The oldest and best known midsummer fair in Romania is the Drăgaica fair, held in Buzău between 10 and 24 June every year. There are many superstitions related to this day, particularly those involving marriage or death. The term Sânziene originates in the Latin "Sancta Diana", and superstitions relating to this day are mainly romantic in nature, referring to young girls and their marriage prospects.

Russia
Many rites of this holiday are connected with water, fertility and autopurification. The girls, for example, would float their flower garlands on the water of rivers and tell their fortunes from their movement. Lads and girls would jump over the flames of bonfires. Nude bathing is likewise practiced. Nights on the Eve of Ivan Kupala inspired Modest Mussorgsky to create his Night on Bald Mountain. A prominent Ivan Kupala night scene is featured in Andrei Tarkovsky's film Andrei Rublev. Also, in Saint Petersburg the White Nights Festival is also predominantly connected with water.

The Yakut people of the Sakha Republic celebrate a solstitial ceremony, Ysyakh, involving tethering a horse to a pole and circle dancing around it. Betting on Reindeer or horse racing would often take place afterward. The traditions are derived from Tengriism, the ancient sun religion of the region which has since been driven out by the Russian empire, Russian Orthodox Church and finally the Communist Party. The traditions have since been encouraged.

Serbia

Ivanjdan is celebrated on July 7, according to the Serbian Orthodox Church. Saint John (Sveti Jovan) is known by the name Igritelj (dancer) because it is thought the sun is dancing on this day. Among traditions are that girls watch the sunrise through their wreath, to become red as the sun, towards the evening in the heights, Ivanjske vatre (kresovi, bonfire) are lit, and dancing and singing takes place. It is a tradition for people to become godfathers and blood brothers on this day, as John is a symbol of character and rectitude.

Slovenia
In Slovenia, Kresna noč (Midsummer Night) used to be celebrated on June 21, but the celebration was later moved to May 1, International Workers Day. Kresna noč used to be connected with the Slavic god Kresnik, who was later replaced by St. John the Baptist.

Spain

The traditional midsummer party in Spain is the celebration in honour of Saint John the Baptist (Spanish: San Juan, Catalan: Sant Joan, Galician: San Xoán, Asturian: San Xuan) and takes place in the evening of June 23 Saint John's Eve. It is common in many areas of the country. In some areas, bonfires are traditionally named tequeos, which means people of the dance. Parties are organized usually at beaches, where bonfires are lit and a set of firework displays usually take place. On the Mediterranean coast, especially in Catalonia and Valencia, special foods such as coca de Sant Joan are also served on this occasion. In Alicante, since 1928, the bonfires of Saint John were developed into elaborate constructions inspired by the Falles, or Fallas, of Valencia.

Midsummer tradition is also especially strong in northern areas of the country, such as Galicia, Asturias, Cantabria and the Basque Country, where one can easily identify the rituals that reveal the pagan beliefs widespread throughout Europe in Neolithic times. These beliefs pivot on three basic ideas: the importance of medicinal plants, especially in relation to health, youth and beauty; the protective character of fire to ward men off evil spirits and witches and, finally, the purifying, miraculous effects of water. What follows is a summary of Galician traditions surrounding St. John's festival in relation to these three elements.
 Medicinal plants: Traditionally, women collect several species of plants on St. John's eve. These vary from area to area, but mostly include fennel, different species of fern (e.g. Dryopteris filix-mas, Osmunda regalis), rue (herb of grace, Ruta graveolens), rosemary (Rosmarinus officinalis), dog rose (Rosa canina), lemon verbena (Aloysia citrodora), St John's wort (Hypericum perforatum), mallows (Malva sylvestris), laburnum, foxgloves (Digitalis purpurea) and elder (Sambucus) flowers. In some areas, these are arranged in a bunch and hung in doorways. In most others, they are dipped in a vessel with water and left outside exposed to the dew of night until the following morning (o dia de San Xoan – St. John's day), when people use the resulting flower water to wash their faces.
 Water: Tradition holds it that the medicinal plants mentioned above are most effective when dipped in water collected from seven different springs. Also, on some beaches, it was traditional for women who wanted to be fertile to bathe in the sea until they were washed by 9 waves.
 Fire: Bonfires are lit, usually around midnight both on beaches and inland, so much so that one usually cannot tell the smoke from the mist common in this Atlantic corner of Iberia at this time of the year, and it smells burnt everywhere. Occasionally, a dummy is placed at the top, representing a witch or the devil. Young and old gather around them and feast mostly on pilchards, potatoes boiled in their skins and maize bread. When it is relatively safe to jump over the bonfire, it is done three times (although it could also be nine or any odd number) for good luck at the cry of "meigas fora" (witches off!).It is also common to drink Queimada, a beverage resulting from setting alight Galician grappa mixed with sugar, coffee beans and pieces of fruit, which is prepared while chanting an incantation against evil spirits.

Sweden

Raising and dancing around a maypole (majstång or midsommarstång) is an activity that attracts families and many others. Greenery placed over houses and barns was supposed to bring good fortune and health to people and livestock; this old tradition of decorating with greens continues, though most people no longer take it seriously. To decorate with greens was called att maja (to may) and may be the origin of the word majstång, maja coming originally from the month May, or vice versa. Other researchers say the term came from German merchants who raised the maypole in June because the Swedish climate made it impossible to find the necessary greens and flowers in May, and continued to call it a maypole.

In earlier times, small spires wrapped in greens were erected; this probably predates the maypole tradition, which is believed by many to have come from the continent in the Middle Ages.

In Sweden Midsummer's day is a Saturday between June 20 and June 26, but as is usual in Sweden the actual celebration is on the eve, i.e. a Friday between June 19 and June 25. Midsummer's Eve is a de facto public holiday in Sweden with offices and many shops closed.

Like in Norway and Finland, it is believed that if a girl picks 7 different flowers in silence of the midsummer night and puts them underneath her pillow, she will dream of her future husband.

Another tradition on a Swedish Midsummer is to end it with a skinny dip at night. It's not mandatory to be naked, but many will be completely naked accompanied with an old or new partner after a couple of the famous schnapps.

Ukraine

Ivan Kupala was the old Kyiv Rus' name for John the Baptist. Up to the present day, the Rus' Midsummer Night (or Ivan's Day) is known as one of the most expressive Kyiv Rus' folk and pagan holidays. Ivan Kupala Day is the day of summer solstice celebrated in Ukraine on June 23 NS and July 6 OS. Before the day was named for St John, this was a celebration of a pagan fertility rite involving bathing in water.  Since St John the Baptist's birth is celebrated at this time, some elements of Kupala's pagan origins were seen to be roughly synonymous with Christian meanings, most notably the parallel of Baptism as cleansing from sins, so the holiday in a Christian-modified form has been accepted into the Orthodox Christian calendar.  In modern times, due to increasing secularization, it is possible to find Kupala being celebrated in a manner closer to its pagan roots.

United Kingdom

In Great Britain from the 13th century, Midsummer was celebrated on Midsummer Eve (St. John's Eve, June 23) and St. Peter's Eve (June 28) with the lighting of bonfires, feasting, and merrymaking.

England

In late 14th-century England, John Mirk of Lilleshall Abbey, Shropshire, gives the following description: "At first, men and women came to church with candles and other lights and prayed all night long. In the process of time, however, men left such devotion and used songs and dances and fell into lechery and gluttony turning the good, holy devotion into sin." The church fathers decided to put a stop to these practices and ordained that people should fast on the evening before, and thus turned waking into fasting.

Mirk adds that at the time of his writing, "...in worship of St John the Baptist, men stay up at night and make three kinds of fires: one is of clean bones and no wood and is called a "bonnefyre"; another is of clean wood and no bones, and is called a wakefyre, because men stay awake by it all night; and the third is made of both bones and wood and is called, "St. John's fire" (Festial 182)." These traditions largely ended after the Reformation, but persisted in rural areas up until the 19th century before petering out.

Other Midsummer festivities had uneasy relations with the Reformed establishment. The Chester Midsummer Watch Parade, begun in 1498, was held at every Summer Solstice in years when the Chester Mystery Plays were not performed. Despite the cancellation of the plays in 1575, the parade continued; in 1599, however, the Lord Mayor ordered that the parades be banned and the costumes destroyed. The parade was permanently banned in 1675.

Traditional Midsummer bonfires are still lit on some high hills in Cornwall (see Carn Brea and Castle an Dinas on Castle Downs). This tradition was revived by the Old Cornwall Society in the early 20th century. This week long festival normally starts on the Friday nearest St John's Day.  lasts several days and culminates in Mazey Day. This is a revival of the Feast of St John with fireworks and bonfires.

In England, Midsummer Day (24 June) is traditionally one of the quarter days.

Scotland
Midsummer festivals are celebrated throughout Scotland, notably in the Scottish Borders where Peebles holds its Beltane Week. The Eve of St. John has special magical significance and was used by Sir Walter Scott as the title, and theme, for a pseudo-ballad poem. He invented a legend in which the lady of Smailholm Tower, near Kelso, keeps vigil by the midnight fires three nights in a row (see above) and is visited by her lover; but when her husband returns from battle, she learns he slew that lover on the first night, and she has been entertained by a very physical ghost.

Wales
Great agricultural fairs used to be held at this time, along with merriment and dancing. A bonfire was also kept this night. With the advent of non-conformist beliefs on the Welsh socio-political culture, this (among so many other similar festivals) suffered greatly, and its observance finally died out in south-east Wales by the end of the 19th century. However, since 1977, a folk-dance revival started in Cardiff, and is held now annually on this feast day

United States

Midsummer celebrations held throughout the United States are largely derived from the cultures of immigrants who arrived from various European nations since the 19th century.  With the rise of earth-centered spirituality, many, including Unitarian Universalists, celebrate the summer solstice as a religious holiday.

Alaska
As the state of Alaska, northernmost state in the nation, straddles the Arctic Circle, midsummer is a time when most of the state is in daylight or civil twilight the entire day. The Midnight Sun Game is an annual tradition in the city of Fairbanks, in which a regulation game of baseball is played at 10:30 p.m. local time, through the midnight hour, with no artificial lighting.

California
Since 1974, Santa Barbara has hosted an annual Summer Solstice celebration, typically on the weekend of or the weekend after the actual solstice. It includes a festival and parade.

In Santa Clara County, the Swedish American Patriotic League has held a Midsummer celebration at Sveadal for more than 120 years. It includes a parade, decorating and raising a Maypole, dancing and other activities.

Illinois
Geneva hosts a Swedish Day festival on the third Sunday of June. The event, featuring maypole-raising, dancing, and presentation of an authentic Viking ship, dates back to 1911.

Kansas

Lindsborg, Kansas, commonly called Little Sweden, hosts an annual Midsummer celebration in honor of its 1869 Swedish founding. The festival includes a 5K Run, free swim at the local pool, Kubb tournament, Swedish dancing, craft demonstrations, and food vendors, including the Lindsborg Swedish Folkdancers serving Viking-on-a-Stick. The town is also the home of the Swedish Pavilion historic site, built as an international exposition building for the 1904 St. Louis World's Fair and features a maypole year-round.

Maine 
New Sweden, Maine. Ever since 51 Swedish immigrants came to Aroostook County, Maine in 1870, supported by a Legislative Act authored by William W. Thomas Jr., who had served as American Consul in Sweden under Abraham Lincoln, residents of the town have celebrated Midsommar. Celebrations are usually held the weekend before the holiday in Sweden and merge Swedish traditions such as the decorating and raising of the Midsommar pole, folk dancing, and feasting alongside American traditions. Thomas Jr. selected this region for a Swedish colony, in part, because the landscape, flora and fauna are similar to that of Dalarna County, Sweden.

Michigan
In Kaleva,  is celebrated annually on or near the Summer Solstice by Gathering at the Village Roadside Park.

Oregon
The Astoria Scandinavian Midsummer Festival has been a tradition on the North Coast of Oregon for over forty years. The Festival takes place typically on the 3rd full weekend of June. The festival embodies the rich cultural heritage that was transplanted to the Astoria, Oregon, region by emigrating Scandinavians. In the Pacific Northwest they found the same bounteous seas and forests as in their native lands and the demand for their skills at managing them.

New York
The NYC Swedish Midsummer celebrations in Battery Park, New York City, attracts some 3,000–5,000 people annually, which makes it one of the largest celebrations after the ones held in Leksand and at the Skansen Park in Stockholm. Sweden Day, a Midsummer celebration which also honors Swedish heritage and history, has been held annually on the sound in Throgs Neck in New York since 1941. Swedish Midsummer is also celebrated in other places with large Swedish and Scandinavian populations, such as Rockford, Illinois, Chicago, Minneapolis, Minnesota, and Lindsborg, Kansas. The Swedish "language village" (summer camp) , run by Concordia College in Minnesota, also celebrates Midsummer.

Washington
The Seattle neighborhood of Fremont puts on a large Summer Solstice Parade and Pageant, which for many years has controversially included painted naked cyclists. In St. Edwards Park in Kenmore, the Skandia Folkdance Society hosts , which includes a Scandinavian solstice pole.

Wyoming
A solstitial celebration is held on Casper Mountain at Crimson Dawn park. Crimson Dawn is known in the area for the great stories of mythical creatures and people that live on Casper Mountain. The celebration is attended by many people from the community, and from around the country. A large bonfire is held and all are invited to throw a handful of red soil into the fire in hopes that they get their wish granted.

Analogous summer solstice observances

Neopaganism
As forms of Neopaganism can be quite different and have very different origins, these representations can vary considerably, despite the shared name. Some celebrate in a manner as close as possible to how they believe ancient pagans observed the summer solstice, while others observe the holiday with rituals culled from numerous other unrelated sources, the Germanic culture being just one of the sources used.

At the ancient monument of Stonehenge, in the English county of Wiltshire, many people like to gather for the Summer Solstice sunrise which is in alignment with the stones.

In Neo-druidism, the term Alban Hefin is used for the summer solstice. The name was invented by the late 18th century Welsh Romantic author and prolific literary forger Iolo Morganwg.

Germanic Neopaganism

Germanic neopagans call their summer solstice festival Litha, which is part of the reconstructed Germanic calendar used by some Germanic Neopagans and takes its name from Bede's De temporum ratione that provides Anglo-Saxon names for the two months roughly corresponding to June and July as līða, distinguished in Bosworth and Toller's dictionary as sē ǽrra líða ("the earlier Litha") and sē æftera līða ("the later Litha") with an intercalary third month of līða on leap years or Triliði ("three-Litha" years). In modern times, Litha is celebrated by neopagans who emphasize what they believe to be the reconstruction of Anglo-Saxon Germanic paganism.

See also

 Winter solstice
 Saint John's Eve
 Christianisation of saints and feasts
 Holi
 Midnight sun

Notes

References

Bibliography

External links

 The Nativity of John the Baptist: The Midsummer Nativity
 De mensibus Anglorum ChXV – Bede's Anglo-Saxon Calendar (in Latin)
 Midsummer's Festival on Hill of Tara, Ireland
 Midsummer – 'WIANKI' in Krakow, Poland
 Traditional Summer Solstice Celebration in Turaida, Latvia – 360° panorama, photos and live sound / Virtual Latvia 
 Celebrating Kupallie, a pagan midsummer holiday – Belarus photo digest Belarus Digest
Thomas M Landy, "Feasts", Catholics & Cultures updated May 12, 2016

Articles containing video clips
European culture
International observances
John the Baptist
June observances
Christian festivals and holy days
Saints days
Modern pagan holidays
Finnish flag flying days
Public holidays in Finland
Swedish flag flying days
Public holidays in Sweden
Public holidays in the United Kingdom
Quarter days
Summer holidays
Culture of Altbayern